Nicktoons is a Dutch pay television channel broadcasting in the Netherlands and Belgium. It launched together with Nick Hits (now NickMusic) on 2 August 2007. It mostly airs animated programs dubbed in the Dutch language.

Current programming 

 The Adventures of Kid Danger
 Alvin and the Chipmunks
 Avatar: The Last Airbender
 Breadwinners
 The Casagrandes
 Dorg Van Dango
 The Fairly OddParents
 Kung Fu Panda: Legends of Awesomeness
 Lego City Adventures
 The Loud House
 The Penguins of Madagascar
 Pig Goat Banana Cricket
 Rainbow Butterfly Unicorn Kitty
 Sanjay and Craig
 SpongeBob SquarePants
 Teenage Mutant Ninja Turtles

Former programming 

 Aaahh!!! Real Monsters
 Action League Now!
 The Adventures of Jimmy Neutron: Boy Genius
 All Grown Up!
 The Angry Beavers
 Animaniacs
 As Told by Ginger
 B-Daman Crossfire
 Back at the Barnyard
 Bakugan Battle Brawlers
 Beyblade: Metal Fusion
 Beyblade: Metal Masters
 Beyblade: Metal Fury
 CatDog
 Catscratch
 ChalkZone
 Corneil & Bernie
 Cosmic Quantum Ray
 Danny Phantom
 Dragon Hunters
 Edgar & Ellen
 El Tigre: The Adventures of Manny Rivera
 Eon Kid
 Fanboy & Chum Chum
 Frankenstein's Cat
 Grossology
 Harvey Beaks
 Hey Arnold!
 Huntik: Secrets & Seekers
 I.N.K. Invisible Network Of Kids
 Invader Zim
 Johnny Test
 KaBlam!
 Kappa Mikey
 The Legend of Korra
 Making Fiends
 Mew Mew Power
 The Mighty B!
 Monster Allergy
 Monsters vs. Aliens
 Monsuno
 Mr. Meaty
 My Life as a Teenage Robot
 Pinky and the Brain
 Planet Sheen
 Rabbids Invasion
 Random! Cartoons
 The Ren & Stimpy Show
 Ricky Sprocket: Showbiz Boy
 Rise of the Teenage Mutant Ninja Turtles
 RoboRoach
 Robot and Monster
 Rocket Monkeys
 Rocket Power
 Rocko's Modern Life
 Rugrats
 Sabrina: The Animated Series
 Speed Racer: The Next Generation
 Spliced
 Storm Hawks
 Supernormal
 Tak and the Power of Juju
 Totally Spies!
 Transformers: Armada
 Transformers: Energon
 Transformers: Cybertron
 Transformers: Animated
 Trollz
 T.U.F.F. Puppy
 Viva Pinata
 Wayside
 The Wild Thornberrys
 The X's
 Yu-Gi-Oh!

References

Television channels in the Netherlands
Television channels in Flanders
Television channels in Belgium
Children's television networks
Television channels and stations established in 2007
2007 establishments in the Netherlands
2007 establishments in Belgium